Aaron Bauer's house gecko (Hemidactylus aaronbaueri) is a species of lizard in the family Gekkonidae. The species is endemic to the Western Ghats in Maharashtra, India.

Etymology
The specific name, aaronbaueri, is in honour of American herpetologist Aaron Matthew Bauer.

Description
H. aaronbaueri is oviparous.

Habitat

References

Further reading
Giri VB (2008). "A new rock dwelling Hemidactylus (Squamata : Gekkonidae) from Maharashtra, India". Hamadryad 32: 25–33. (Hemidactylus aaronbaueri, new species).

Hemidactylus
Reptiles described in 2008
Reptiles of India
Endemic fauna of the Western Ghats